Pad Fork is a stream in the U.S. state of West Virginia.

Pad Fork most likely derives its name from the lily pads along its course.

See also
List of rivers of West Virginia

References

Rivers of Roane County, West Virginia
Rivers of West Virginia